Mass in F Minor is the third studio album by American rock band The Electric Prunes, released in 1968.  It consists of a musical setting of the mass sung in Latin and Greek and arranged in the psychedelic style of the band, and was written and arranged by David Axelrod.

Background and recording
Following the limited commercial success of the Electric Prunes' previous album, Underground, the band's manager Lenny Poncher and their producer Dave Hassinger, whose company owned the rights to the band name, agreed with Reprise Records that their third album would be written and arranged by David Axelrod, a classically trained musician.  The album was planned to combine religious and classical elements with psychedelic rock, in a religious-based rock-opera concept album.  Axelrod was given carte blanche by Hassinger to do what he wanted with the Electric Prunes.

When the existing band – singer James Lowe, guitarists Ken Williams and Mike Gannon, bassist Mark Tulin, and drummer Michael "Quint" Weakley – came to record the album, it became apparent that the complex arrangements largely outstripped the band's ability to perform them to the standards expected by Axelrod, or within the time set aside for recording.  Although Lowe, Tulin (the only band member who could read music) and Weakley appeared on all the tracks, and Williams and Gannon also appeared on the first three tracks ("Kyrie Eleison", "Gloria" and "Credo"), the album was finished by studio musicians working with engineer Richie Podolor on guitar, and a Canadian group, the Collectors.  The choral-style vocals were by Lowe, double-tracked.  Hassinger was credited with producing the album.

Release and performance
Mass in F Minor was released in January 1968 and reached number 135 on the Billboard 200. Photos of the band appeared on the back of the record sleeve, though with the band's previous guitarist James 'Weasel' Spagnola shown, rather than Gannon.  The Electric Prunes performed the album's songs in concert just once, at the Santa Monica Civic Auditorium, which Tulin described: From the outset the performance was a disaster. We missed the intro on the first song and it never got any better. Amp speakers blew, charts fell off music stands and everyone was, in general, in a complete state of confusion. Ended up each song turned into one long jam. I think we were, at times, all in the same key. I made my way over to the four celli and four French horns and told them to 'jam in E.' Somehow we would hit a break and James would manage a vocal.  Mercifully, this all ended and as we were leaving a few 'fans' said, 'We didn't know you guys were into avant-garde jazz.'

An eerie version of the opening track, "Kyrie Eleison", became somewhat of an underground favorite when it appeared in the soundtrack for the counterculture film, Easy Rider.

Some later reissues of Mass in F Minor incorrectly credited a later incarnation of the band with recording the album.  The Electric Prunes were credited with a further album arranged by David Axelrod, Release of an Oath, arranged in a similar style to Mass in F Minor, but by that time the original band had dissolved.

Track listing
All songs composed by David Axelrod except where noted.

 "Kyrie Eleison" – 3:21
 "Gloria" – 5:45
 "Credo" – 5:02
 "Sanctus" – 2:57
 "Benedictus" – 4:52
 "Agnus Dei – 4:29

CD bonus tracks
 "Hey Mr. President" (Ritchie Adams, Mark Barkan) – 2:49
 "Flowing Smoothly" (Brett Wade) – 3:04

Personnel
 James Lowe – vocals
 Ken Williams – lead guitar (some tracks)
 Mike Gannon – rhythm guitar (some tracks)
 Mark Tulin – bass
 Michael "Quint" Weakley – drums 
 Richie Podolor – guitar (some tracks)
 The Collectors – (some tracks)

External links
 Independent review and history of the album.
 Electric Prunes Website
 Review of the CD reissue
 Liner notes from the CD reissue

References

The Electric Prunes albums
1968 albums
Acid rock albums
Masses (music)
Reprise Records albums